Morton Cliff is a prominent sub-vertical rock cliff rising to about  above sea level, forming the western escarpment of Williams Point, Livingston Island in the South Shetland Islands off Antarctica. It was named by the UK Antarctic Place-Names Committee in 1998 after British Antarctic Survey field assistant Ashley Morton (born 1953).

References

Cliffs of the South Shetland Islands